Jacobus Enschedé I (19 March 1753 in Haarlem –1 January 1783 in Haarlem) was a Haarlem newspaper editor and printer.

Biography
He was a son of Johannes Enschedé and Helena Hoefnagel. For some time he was a partner in the family company. On 7 September 1779 in Haarlem he married Gertruida Elisabeth van Oosten de Bruyn (Haarlem, 6 June 1759 –Velsen, 24 October 1810) the daughter of Mr. Gerrit Willem van Oosten de Bruyn and Maria Croon. He had no descendants in the company.

References

 Het huis Enschedé 1703–1953, Joh. Enschedé en Zonen, Haarlem 1953
 Enschede aan het Klokhuisplein, (Dutch), by Just Enschede, De Vrieseborch, Haarlem, 1991, 
 Catalogue de la bibliothèque (manuscrits, ouvrages xylographiques, incunables, ouvrages d'estampes, livres curieux et rares) formée pendant le 18e siècle par Messieurs Izaak, Iohannes et le Dr. Iohannes Enschedé, sale catalog for the auction of Enschedé III's collection by Frederik Muller and Martinus Nijhoff, 9 December 1867; version on Google books

1753 births
1783 deaths
People from Haarlem
Dutch businesspeople
Dutch art collectors
Bibliophiles
Dutch printers
Dutch newspaper editors